This is a list of the 1968 APG Tour Qualifying School graduates.

This was the only qualifying school for the American Professional Golfers (APG), a briefly lived breakaway tour that was created by tour golfers who were upset with financial arrangements with the PGA of America. The APG is the direct antecedent for an independent PGA Tour which began shortly thereafter.

The tournament was played over 144 holes at the Doral Country Club in Doral, Florida in mid October. There were 39 players in the field and 21 earned their tour card.

Dutch golfer Martin Roesink was the medallist. Australian Bob Shaw finished in second place.

Sources:

References

1968 3
1968 PGA Tour Qualifying School graduates 3
PGA Tour Qualifying School Graduates
PGA Tour Qualifying School Graduates